Stade Émile-Allais is a World Cup ski course in Courchevel, France. It has regularly hosted women's technical events (slalom, giant slalom) since 2010, and is named after local ski racing legend Émile Allais (1912–2012).

World Cup

Women

Men

Course sections 
La Haut Du Plantrey, Le Mur Emile-Allais, Le Double Roller

References

External links
FIS Alpine Ski World Cup – Courchevel, France
Ski-db.com - Courchevel women's races
Ski-db.com - Courchevel men's races

Skiing in France

fi:Stade de Slalom Émile Allais
it:Émile Allais (pista sciistica)